From 1960 to 1988 there were Pershing missile launches for testing from various sites in the US. The systems included the Pershing 1 Field Artillery Missile System, the Pershing 1a Field Artillery Missile System and the Pershing II Weapon System. Initial launches were from what is now the Eastern Range at Cape Canaveral, Florida using Launch Complex 30A using the dismounted erector launcher. Later launches were from the full transporter erector launcher (TEL). Further launches were conducted at White Sands Missile Range (WSMR) using tactical equipment.

Purpose 
Initial missile launches were for research and development purposes. There were 52 R&D launches in the Pershing 1 development cycle.

In 1965, the Army contracted with the Applied Physics Laboratory (APL) of Johns Hopkins University to develop and implement a test and evaluation program. APL developed the Pershing Operational Test Program (OTP), provided technical support to the Pershing Operational Test Unit (POTU), identified problem areas and improved the performance and survivability of the Pershing systems.

POTU planned, scheduled, and executed the tests, evaluations, and missile firings to support OTP. POTU would select three firing batteries from the 56th Field Artillery Command in West Germany to participate in Follow-on Operational Tests (FOT) using an unannounced field alert status verifications (FASV) at the Quick Reaction Alert (QRA) site. POTU selected missiles, equipment and personnel (colloquially referred to as a tap) for transport to either Cape Canaveral or White Sands Missile Range. After arrival, the missiles and launchers would be equipped with telemetry and the missiles would have range safety equipment installed for in-flight destruction if needed. Shoots were supported by elements of the 3rd Battalion, 9th Field Artillery Regiment from Fort Sill, Oklahoma. The missile crews would perform tactical countdowns and launch the missile. Data collectors from APL observed the crews and equipment. After the shoot, data and evaluations were compiled into reports of the performance estimates of the operational capabilities of the Pershing missile system.

Markings and telemetry 
Initial test missiles were painted white with black striping in a roll pattern that aided in tracking and observation of roll. Tactical missiles were painted green; first olive drab then later forest green. A very few missiles were painted in woodland camouflage. Pershing 1 and 1a missiles tapped for a shoot would have orange stripes added to the rocket motors and the guidance section and had a dummy warhead with black and white roll pattern. Pershing II missiles had orange and yellow stripes added for tracking. The white tip of the Pershing II was not a marking, it was a radome formed of a radar transparent ablative heat shield with the fuze at the very tip in black.

The missiles had dummy warheads that contained telemetry equipment that monitored missile operation and radioed it back to the ground station. The Pershing 1 and Pershing 1a programmer test station and the erector launcher had a recorder installed to monitor all signals; for Pershing II this was installed on the erector launcher.

Postal covers 

The post offices at White Sands Missile Range and Cape Canaveral issued event covers for all launches. Most covers were created using a rubber stamp with the image of a generic missile and a stamped date and time. The first eight launches of the Pershing 1a were recognized with a specially printed cover.

Sites 

 Eastern Range, Cape Canaveral, Florida
 Launch Complex 30: 49 launches
 Launch Complex 30A
 Launch Complex 30D
 Launch Complex 30E
 Launch Complex 31A: 10 launches
 Launch Complex 16: 128 launches
 White Sands Missile Range, New Mexico
 Hueco Range, Fort Bliss, Texas
 McGregor Range, Fort Bliss, Texas
 Fort Wingate, New Mexico
 Gilson Butte, Utah
 Black Mesa Test Range, Blanding, Utah
 Green River Launch Complex, Utah

Units 

 7th Army: Seventh United States Army
 4/41 FA: 4th Battalion, 41st Field Artillery Regiment
 1/41 FA: 1st Battalion, 41st Field Artillery Regiment
 1/81 FA: 1st Battalion, 81st Field Artillery Regiment
 3/84 FA: 3rd Battalion, 84th Field Artillery Regiment
 German: German Air Force
 FKW1: Missile Wing 1
 FKGrp 12: Missile Group 12
 FKGrp 13: Missile Group 13
 FKW2: Missile Wing 2
 FKGrp 21: Missile Group 21
 FKGrp 22: Missile Group 23
 ARMTE: Army Materiel Test and Evaluation Directorate
 2/44 FA: 2nd Missile Battalion, 44th Artillery Regiment

Launches 
 ASP: Annual service practice
 GRAD: Graduation practice
 BRD: Bundesrepublik Deutschland; West Germany
 DASO: demonstration and shakedown operations launch
 FOT: follow-on test
 Improved Pershing 1a: Block 7 modifications adding the Azimuth Reference Unit and the Sequential Launch Adapter
 TEL: transporter erector launcher

Pershing 1

Pershing 1a

Pershing II 

The first Pershing II launches were in 1977 using the original design configuration with the Pershing 1a motors and a new re-entry vehicle. The 1979 decision to increase the Pershing range necessitated the development of new motors.

Gallery

References 

 

Launches

 
 
 
 
 
 
 
 
 

Pershing missile